Floods in Thailand are regular natural disasters in Thailand which happen nearly every year during the monsoon season.  The monsoon seasons in the country are distinct by region, the southern part mirrors the Malay Peninsula and monsoon begins in Oct and ends in March.  The rest of the nation has monsoons and/or frequent thundershowers from April/May through October, but often lasts beyond October.

Thailand cycles yearly between drought and flooding. Breaking this cycle was the subject of the "Sustainable Water Management Forum 2016" in Bangkok. The event hosted water management specialists from countries which have dealt with water management challenges such as the Netherlands, Israel, and Singapore. One attendee observed that, "In Thailand, we receive around 754,000 million m3 of rain per year. That is more than enough for the annual water demand of around 100,000 million m3.... However, only 5.7 percent of rainfall, 70,370 million m3, empties into the reservoirs."

Events
1938 - Bangkok was flooded
1983 - 42 provinces were flooded
1995 - Big floods in Bangkok
 2010 floods in Thailand and north Malaysia
 2011 Southern Thailand floods
 2011 Thailand floods
 2013 Southeast Asian floods
 2014–15 floods in Southeast Asia and South Asia
 2017 Southern Thailand floods

References